Hong Kong Fir Shipping Co Ltd v Kawasaki Kisen Kaisha Ltd [1962] 2 QB 26  is a landmark English contract law case. It introduced the concept of innominate terms, a category between "warranties" and "conditions". 

Under the English sale of goods principles, a condition is a term whose breach entitles the injured party to repudiate the contract, but a breach of warranty shall give rise only to damages. In this case, Diplock LJ proposed that some terms could lead either to the right to terminate a contract as a remedy, or to the mere entitlement to damages (without a right to terminate). What mattered was not whether a particular contract term was called a "warranty" or a "condition", but how serious was the breach of the term. 

In short, the test for whether or not one may repudiate has now become, "does the breach deny the claimant the main benefit of the contract?"  However, modern commercial custom has since established that some breaches, such as failure to meet a "notice of readiness to load" a sea cargo, will always be repudiatory.

Facts
Hong Kong Fir Shipping hired out their elderly ship,  the "Hong Kong Fir", under a two-year time charter-party to Kawasaki Kisen Kaisha. It was to sail in ballast from Liverpool to collect a cargo at Newport News, Virginia, and then to proceed via Panama to Osaka.  A term in the charterparty agreement required the ship to be seaworthy and to be "in every way fitted for ordinary cargo service." However the crew were both insufficient in number and incompetent to maintain her old-fashioned machinery; and the chief engineer was a drunkard. On the voyage from Liverpool to Osaka, the engines suffered several breakdowns, and was off-hire for a total of five weeks, undergoing repairs.  On arrival at Osaka, a further fifteen weeks of repairs were needed before the ship was seaworthy again. By this time, barely seventeen months of the two-year time-charter remained. Once in Osaka, market freight rates fell, and Kawasaki terminated the contract citing Hong Kong's breach. Hong Kong responded that Kawasaki were now the party in breach for wrongfully repudiating the contract.

At first instance, it was held that although the ship was a seaworthy vessel on delivery in Liverpool, Hong Kong Fir had not exercised due diligence to maintain the vessel in an efficient and seaworthy state. However, the trial judge found that this breach was not substantial enough to entitle the charterer to repudiate the contract. Kawasaki appealed.

Judgment
The Court of Appeal held that the "seaworthiness" term was not breached in a sufficiently serious way to entitle the charterer to terminate. It was an "innominate term". Diplock LJ's judgment went as follows:

Significance
Both under the common law and under the Hague-Visby Rules, the term "seaworthiness" covers not just the ship itself, but its crew, its provisions and equipment, and its suitability for both the cargo and the voyage.  The Hong Kong Fir confirmed that the term "seaworthiness" has a very broad meaning ranging from trivial defects like a missing life preserver or a major flaw that would sink the ship. Accordingly, it is impossible to determine ahead of time what type of term it is. Thus, the type of breach must be determined by the judges. "Seaworthiness" is defined both by common law and by statute. In McFadden v Blue Star Lines [1905] 1 KB 607 it was stated that, to be seaworthy, a vessel must have the degree of fitness that an ordinarily careful and prudent shipowner would require his vessel to have at the commencement of a voyage, having regard to all possible circumstances. And the Marine Insurance Act 1906 s 39(4) provides that "a ship is deemed to be seaworthy when she is reasonably fit in all respects to encounter the ordinary perils of the adventure insured."  

In the Hong Kong case, the issue was not whether the unseaworthiness was "serious" or "minor"; rather the question was whether the undoubtedly serious unseaworthiness had had an effect sufficiently grave to allow the charterer to repudiate.  On the facts, given that the charterer had had the "substantial benefit" of the contract for some 80% of the time period, the court held that the breach was adequately remedied by damages.

The Hong Kong Fir decision was met with some alarm in the shipping world, where certainty is crucial. The problem was the delay element; one had to "wait and see" the effect of the breach. The enormous costs involved in chartering mean that parties cannot afford to leisurely loiter, whilst pondering the consequences of the breach.  Soon after, in The Mihalis Angelos [1971] 1 QB 164, it was held the impossibility of the shipowner to meet the "expected ready to load" date, ipso facto entitled the charterer to repudiate for anticipatory breach of condition.

See also

Maredelanto Compania Naviera SA v Bergbau-Handel GmbH [1971] 1 QB 164
Bunge Corporation v Tradax SA [1981] 2 All ER 513
L Schuler AG v Wickman Machine Tool Sales Ltd [1974] AC 235
Golden Strait Corporation v Nippon Yusen Kubishka Kaisha [2007] UKHL 12
Jackson v Union Marine Insurance Co Ltd (1874) LR 10 CP 125

Notes

References
Rice v Great Yarmouth Borough Council (26 July 2000) The Times
BS&N Ltd v Micado Shipping Ltd (The Seaflower (No 2) [2000] 2 All ER (Comm) 169

English termination case law
Court of Appeal (England and Wales) cases
1961 in British law
1961 in case law